"Trouble Sleeping" is a song by English singer-songwriter Corinne Bailey Rae from her self-titled debut album (2006). It was written by Rae, John Beck and Steve Chrisanthou, and was released as the album's third single on 29 May 2006. Rae performed this song and "Like a Star" on the 27 November 2006 episode of the NBC comedy-drama series Studio 60 on the Sunset Strip. "Trouble Sleeping" was also featured on the NBC medical drama ER and on the CBS police procedural drama NCIS.

Track listings
UK CD 1 and 7-inch single / German CD single
"Trouble Sleeping" – 3:27
"Munich" (Radio 1 Live Lounge version) – 4:01

UK CD 2 and German CD maxi single
"Trouble Sleeping" – 3:27
"Till It Happens to You" (live at Shepherd's Bush Empire) – 4:49
"Breathless" (live at Leeds Met) – 5:09
"Trouble Sleeping" (video)

Digital download
"Trouble Sleeping" – 3:26
"Till It Happens to You" (live at Shepherd's Bush Empire) – 4:46
"Breathless" (live at Leeds Met) – 5:08

Personnel
Credits adapted from the liner notes of Corinne Bailey Rae.

 Corinne Bailey Rae – vocals, backing vocals, percussion
 John Beck – keyboards
 Steve Chrisanthou – electric guitar, organ, production, programming, recording
 Jim Corry – tenor saxophone
 Kenny Higgins – bass guitar
 Jason Rae – alto saxophone
 Malcolm Strachan – trumpet
 Jeremy Wheatley – mixing

Charts

Weekly charts

Year-end charts

Radio and release history

References

2000s ballads
2006 singles
2006 songs
Corinne Bailey Rae songs
EMI Records singles
Songs written by Corinne Bailey Rae
Songs written by John Beck (songwriter)
Soul ballads
Songs written by Steve Chrisanthou
Smooth jazz songs